Naqaab may refer to:
 Niqāb, cloth that covers the face in a hijab
 Naqaab (2007 film), an Indian Hindi-language suspense thriller film
 Naqaab (2018 film), an Indian Bengali-language supernatural action comedy film
 Naqab (film), a 1955 Indian fantasy film

See also
 Naqab or Negev, a desert and semidesert region of southern Israel
 Naqab, Iran (disambiguation)